Mark Edward Dusbabek (born June 23, 1964) is a former American football linebacker who played three seasons with the Minnesota Vikings of the National Football League. He was drafted by the Houston Oilers in the fourth round of the 1987 NFL Draft. He played college football at the University of Minnesota and attended Faribault High School in Faribault, Minnesota.

References

External links
Just Sports Stats

Living people
1964 births
Players of American football from Minnesota
American football linebackers
Minnesota Golden Gophers football players
Minnesota Vikings players
People from Faribault, Minnesota